Spintharus davidbowiei is a species of comb-footed spider in the family Theridiidae. It is found in Mexico. It is one of 15 new species described in 2018. About its naming, the authors wrote: "The species epithet honours the great artist David Bowie who passed away prematurely in 2016, but whose music will continue to inspire the generations to come."

References

Theridiidae
Spiders described in 2018
Spiders of Mexico